Gospels for the Sick is the first album by Scum.

The album was recorded at Crystal Canyon Studios in Oslo in one session in 2004 and released in Norway in fall 2005, in August in Europe and October in North America.

The album is noted for being a very unusual style of black metal fused with hardcore punk influences.

The album was nominated for the Alarm Awards (Norwegian music awards) in the metal category, but lost to Stonegard.

The artwork on the CD was done by Stephen O'Malley and the band photos by Sebastian Ludvigsen. The music was created by Samoth, Cosmocrator and Casey Chaos, while the lyrics were all written by Casey Chaos.

Track listing 
"Protest Life" (5:16)
"Gospels for the Sick" (5:05)
"Throw Up on You" (3:15)
"Night of 1000 Deaths" (3:45)
"Truth Won't Be Sold" (3:37)
"Hate the Sane" (4:26)
"Deathpunkscumfuck" (2:07)
"Road to " (4:33)
"Backstabbers Go to Heaven" (4:12)
"The Perfect Mistake" (5:22)

The track "Bleeders", an album B-side, can be found on MySpace.

References

External links 
 Scum Band

2005 debut albums
Scum (band) albums